Schwarzach is a river of Bavaria, Germany. It is a left tributary of the Main in Schwarzach am Main.

See also

List of rivers of Bavaria

References

Rivers of Bavaria
Rivers of Germany